The 2022–23 season is Al-Fayha's 69th year in their existence and their fifth non-consecutive season in the Pro League. The club will participate in the Pro League, the King Cup, and the Super Cup.

The season covers the period from 1 July 2022 to 30 June 2023.

Players

Squad information

Transfers and loans

Transfers in

Loans in

Transfers out

Pre-season

Competitions

Overview

Goalscorers

Last Updated: 17 March 2023

Assists

Last Updated: 17 March 2023

Clean sheets

Last Updated: 2 March 2023

References 

Al-Fayha FC seasons
Fayha